General elections were held in Botswana on 8 September 1984. Although the result was a fifth successive landslide victory for the Botswana Democratic Party, which won 29 of the 34 elected seats, the elections saw the opposition Botswana National Front make gains, winning both seats in the capital Gaborone and take control of all urban councils except Selebi-Phikwe in the simultaneous local elections.

Background
Following the death of President Seretse Khama in 1980, the 1984 elections were the first contested with Quett Masire as leader of the BDP.

Electoral system
The 34 elected members of the National Assembly were elected in single-member constituencies, an increase of two from the 1979 elections. Following the 1981 census, constituencies were redrawn and Gaborone was split into two.

Campaign
A total of 82 candidates contested the election as party representatives, with the BDP being the only party to contest all 34 seats. The Botswana National Front ran in 27 constituencies, the Botswana People's Party in 13, and the Botswana Independence Party and Botswana Progressive Union in four.

The campaign was focussed on economic issues linked to the effect on the diamond industry of droughts and recession.

Results

Aftermath
Following the elections, Botswana National Front co-leader Kenneth Koma went to court to have the result in the Gaborone South constituency overturned; Koma had lost to Vice-President Peter Mmusi, but an unopened ballot box was discovered after the final count. The High Court annulled the result and a by-election was held in December in which Koma defeated Mmusi.

References

Elections in Botswana
Botswana
General
Election and referendum articles with incomplete results